Below is a list of notable associated people of Washington and Lee University in Lexington, Virginia, United States. The year after each name designates the graduation year, if the person is an alumnus.

Law and politics
Robert H. Adams 1806 - United States Senator from Mississippi
Samuel B. Avis, Law - United States Congressman from West Virginia, 1913-1915
Ronald J. Bacigal, Law 1967 - professor of law, University of Richmond School of Law
Robert D. Bailey, Jr., Law - West Virginia Secretary of State, 1965-1969
Meredith Attwell Baker, 1990 - former Federal Communications Commission Commissioner; President of CTIA – The Wireless Association
Newton D. Baker, Law 1894 - Secretary of War under President Woodrow Wilson, Mayor of Cleveland, Ohio, and named partner at BakerHostetler
Matt Bevin, 1989 - 62nd Governor of Kentucky
Bill Brock 1953 - 2021 former U.S. Senator from Tennessee (1971–77), chairman of the National Republican Party (1977–81); U.S. Trade Representative (1981–85); Secretary of Labor (1985–87)
Franklin Brockson, Law - United States Congressman from Delaware, 1913-1915
William T. Brotherton Jr., Law - Chief Justice of the Supreme Court of West Virginia, 1989-1994
Clarence J. Brown, Law 1915 - President of Brown Publishing Company and US Congressman from Ohio, 1939-1965
Nathan P. Bryan, Law 1895 - U.S. Senator from the State of Florida, Judge on the United States Court of Appeals for the Fifth Circuit 
William James Bryan, Law 1899 - U.S. Senator from Florida 
Archibald C. Buchanan, Law 1914 - Justice on the Supreme Court of Virginia
Bruce L. Castor, Jr., Law 1986 - district attorney, Montgomery County, Pennsylvania (2000–2008); Commissioner, Montgomery County, Pennsylvania (2008-2016); Attorney General (interim) and first Solicitor General of Pennsylvania 2106; President, Pennsylvania District Attorneys' Association 
Lewis Preston Collins II, Law - Lieutenant Governor of Virginia
Christian Compton 1950, Law 1953 - Justice of the Supreme Court of Virginia, 1974-2006
Edward Cooper, Law 1892 - U.S. Congressman from West Virginia, 1915-1919
William Fadjo Cravens, Law - U.S. Congressman from Arkansas
T. Kenneth Cribb Jr. 1970 - former Reagan aide and former president of the Intercollegiate Studies Institute
John J. Crittenden 1805 - Speaker of the Kentucky House of Representatives; U.S. Senator, Governor of Kentucky, U.S. Attorney General under Presidents William Henry Harrison and Millard Fillmore; proposed the Crittenden Compromise to keep the Union intact
George William Crump 1804 - member of the United States House of Representatives; first recorded streaker in American history
John J. Davis, Law 1856 - United States Representative from West Virginia 
John W. Davis 1895, Law 1892 - 1924 Democratic nominee for United States President; Ambassador to Britain; Solicitor General; argued more cases before the Supreme Court than anyone else in the twentieth century; American Bar Association President; first President of the Council on Foreign Relations; named partner at Davis Polk & Wardwell 
Mark Steven Davis, Law 1988 - United States District Court Judge for the Eastern District of Virginia 
 Rita Davis, B.A., English, 1993 - Counsel to the Honorable Governor Ralph S. Northam, Governor of Virginia
John W. Eggleston, Law 1910 - Chief Justice of the Virginia Supreme Court, 1958-1969
Gay Elmore, Law - two-time Southern Conference Men's Basketball Player of the Year
 Sarah Feinberg (1999), Interim President of the New York City Transit Authority, and former Administrator of the Federal Railroad Administration
John P. Fishwick, Jr., Law - United States Attorney for the United States District Court for the Western District of Virginia
Henry S. Foote, 1919 - 19th Governor of Mississippi
Vance A. Funk, III, Law 1968 - Mayor of Newark, Delaware
 Maciej Golubiewski (born 1976) - Polish political scientist and Consul General at the Consulate General of the Republic of Poland in New York City
John Goode, Law - 3rd Solicitor General of the United States; United States Congressman from Virginia
John W. Goode - attended undergraduate school 1939-1942 but transferred to the University of Texas at Austin - attorney and Republican political figure in his native San Antonio, Texas  
Bob Goodlatte, Law 1977 - U.S. Congressman from Virginia 
R. Booth Goodwin, Law 1996 - United States Attorney for the Southern District of West Virginia
Herbert B. Gregory, Law 1911 - Justice on the Virginia Supreme Court, 1930-1951
Robert J. Grey, Jr., Law 1976 - American Bar Association President 2004–2005
Morgan Griffith, Law 1983 - Congressman from Virginia 
Duncan Lawrence Groner, Law 1894 - U.S. Attorney; Federal District Judge for United States District Court for the Eastern District of Virginia; Chief Judge of the United States Court of Appeals for the D.C. Circuit 
Pike Hall, Jr., attended 1940s - judge in Shreveport, Louisiana
Alexander Harman, Law - Justice on the Supreme Court of Virginia, 1969-1979
James Hay, Law 1877 - United States Representative from Virginia; Federal Judge on the United States Court of Claims 
George Washington Hays, Law - Governor of Arkansas, 1913-1917
Homer A. Holt 1918, Law 1923 - Governor of West Virginia, 1937-1941 
Linwood Holton, 1944 - Governor of Virginia, 1970-1974
James Murray Hooker, Law 1896 - U.S. Congressman from Virginia
J. Bennett Johnston, Jr. 1953 - U.S. Senator from Louisiana, 1972 to 1997; Washington, D.C.-based lobbyist
Jerrauld Jones, Law 1980 - Judge on the Norfolk Circuit Court
Walter Kelley, 1977, Law 1981 - former federal judge in the Eastern District of Virginia and current partner at Hausfeld 
James L. Kemper, Law 1842 - Governor of Virginia; Confederate General wounded during Pickett's Charge at Gettysburg 
Jackson L. Kiser, Law 1952 - Judge on the United States District Court for the Western District of Virginia
Ruby Laffoon, Law 1890 - Governor of Kentucky  
Joseph Rucker Lamar, Law 1878 - Associate Justice of the Supreme Court of the United States of the United States Supreme Court (1911–1916), Justice of the Supreme Court of Georgia (1903-1905)
Edwin Gray Lee, Law 1859 - brigadier general in the Confederate States of America
Harry Jacob Lemley, Law 1910 - federal judge on both the United States District Court for the Eastern District of Arkansas and the United States District Court for the Western District of Arkansas
Scott Marion Loftin, Law 1899 - U.S. Senator from Florida; president of the American Bar Association 
Mary Beth Long, Law 1998 - former Assistant Secretary of Defense for International Security Affairs at the United States Department of Defense and former attorney with Williams & Connolly LLP
Daniel B. Lucas, Law - poet; justice on the Supreme Court of West Virginia,  1889-1892
J. Michael Luttig 1976 - Assistant Attorney General, Office of Legal Council and Counselor to the Attorney General; former United States Circuit Court of Appeals judge; twice considered by President George W. Bush for nomination to the U.S. Supreme Court; current Executive Vice President and General Counsel, The Boeing Company
John Ashton MacKenzie, Law 1939 - federal judge for the United States District Court for the Eastern District of Virginia
Ross L. Malone, Jr., Law 1932 - United States Deputy Attorney General, General Counsel to General Motors, President of the American Bar Association
John Otho Marsh, Jr., Law 1951 - Secretary of the Army, 1981–1989, United States Congressman 
Robert Murphy Mayo, Law 1859 - United States Representative from Virginia 
Hayes McClerkin 1953 - former Speaker of the Arkansas House of Representatives; Texarkana, Arkansas, attorney
Alexander McNutt - 12th Governor of Mississippi
Thomas Chipman McRae, Law - Governor of Arkansas, United States Representative
Jackson Morton 1814 - U.S. Senator from Florida
Robert Mosbacher 1947 - Secretary of Commerce, 1989-1992
Mark Obenshain, Law 1987 - member of the Senate of Virginia; Republican nominee for Attorney General of Virginia in the 2013 Virginia election
Robert E. Payne, Law 1967 - Judge for the United States District Court for the Eastern District of Virginia 
Mosby Perrow Jr. - Virginia Senator (1943–1964); key figure in Virginia's abandonment of "Massive Resistance" to desegregation
Archer Allen Phlegar - Virginia Supreme Court justice, Virginia State Senator
Miles Poindexter, Law 1891 - Senator from the State of Washington  
Lewis Franklin Powell, Jr. 1929, Law 1931 - Associate Justice of the United States Supreme Court (1972–1987); President of the American Bar Association; named partner at Hunton Williams Gay Powell & Gibson 
William Ray Price, Jr., Law 1978 - longest-serving judge and former Chief Justice of the Supreme Court of Missouri 
Prescott Prince, Law 1983 - attorney defending Khalid Sheikh Mohammed
Lacey E. Putney, Law - longest-serving member of the Virginia House of Delegates in the history of the Virginia General Assembly
Heartsill Ragon, Law - U.S. Congressman from Arkansas; federal judge on the United States District Court for the Western District of Arkansas
Robert W. Ray, Law 1985 - partner at Pryor Cashman LLP in New York City and former head of the US Office of the Independent Counsel (succeeded Kenneth Starr) 
Alfred E. Reames, Law 1893 - U.S. Senator from Oregon
Pat Robertson 1950 - Christian televangelist; founder of several organizations, including Christian Broadcasting Network, the Christian Coalition, the American Center for Law and Justice, and Regent University; host of The 700 Club; candidate for the Republican nomination for President in 1988
Daniel K. Sadler, Law - Justice on the New Mexico Supreme Court
Jared Y. Sanders, Jr., attended 1912-1913 - member of the United States House of Representatives from L ouisiana's 6th congressional district
Tom Sansonetti, Law 1976 - United States Assistant Attorney General for the United States Department of Justice Environment and Natural Resources Division
William H. Smathers - Senator from the State of New Jersey
Abram Penn Staples, Law 1908 - Attorney General of Virginia; justice on the Supreme Court of Virginia
Lawrence Vess Stephens, Law 1877 – Governor of Missouri
Roscoe B. Stephenson, Jr. 1943, Law 1947 - Justice on the Supreme Court of Virginia
William F. Stone, Jr., Law 1966 - Judge for the United States Bankruptcy Court for the Western District of Virginia
Ashley L. Taylor Jr., Law 1993 - partner with Troutman Sanders LLouisiana's 6th congressional districtLP; recognized as one of "The 50 Most Influential Minority Lawyers in America" in 2008 by the National Law Journal 
Charles L. Terry, Jr. - Governor of Delaware 1961–1965 
Thomas Todd 1783 - United States Supreme Court Justice nominated by Thomas Jefferson
Paul S. Trible, Jr. Law 1971 - former US Senator from Virginia, president of Christopher Newport University 
William M. Tuck, Law 1921 - Governor of Virginia 
Henry St. George Tucker III, Law 1876 - U.S. Congressman from Virginia; President of the American Bar Association 
James Clinton Turk, Law 1952 - federal judge and Chief Judge (1973 to 1993) on the United States District Court for the Western District of Virginia 
David Gardiner Tyler, Law 1869 - U.S. Representative, son of President John Tyler, present at Lee's surrender at Appomattox 
Sol Wachtler, Law - former Chief Judge of the New York Court of Appeals (1985–1993)
John W. Warner Jr. 1949 - former secretary of the Navy and retired U.S. Senator from Virginia; for a time, a husband of Elizabeth Taylor
Junius Edgar West, Law - 22nd Lieutenant Governor of Virginia
Kennon C. Whittle, Law 1914 - Justice on the Supreme Court of Virginia and president of the Virginia Bar Association
H. Emory Widener, Jr., Law 1953 - Judge for the United States Court of Appeals for the Fourth Circuit
Seward H. Williams, Law 1895 - U.S. Congressman from Ohio
Joe Wilson 1969 - Congressman from South Carolina who shouted "You lie!" at President Obama during the 2010 State of the Union address
John Minor Wisdom 1925 - Judge, United States Court of Appeals for the Fifth Circuit
Christopher Wolf, Law 1980 - partner at Hogan Lovells; one of the leading American practitioners in the field of privacy and data security law
Harry M. Wurzbach, Law 1896 - U.S Congressman from Texas

Business
Drew Baur 1966 - businessman and owner of St. Louis Cardinals
Berry Boswell Brooks - cotton broker and big-game hunter
Christopher Chenery 1909 - industrialist and horse breeder of Secretariat
Richard L. Duchossois - industrialist, investor, and director of Churchill Downs
Kenn George 1970 - businessman/investor and former member of the Texas House of Representatives
Rupert H. Johnson 1962 - vice chairman of Franklin Resources; donor of $100 million, the largest gift in Washington and Lee's history, mostly directed to honors scholarships
Julius Kruttschnitt 1873 - Southern Pacific Railroad executive
H. F. Lenfest 1953 - philanthropist and CEO of Lenfest Group; gave the second largest donation in W&L's history, a $33 million challenge gift requiring a 1:1 match, on March 21, 2007 (As of December 31, 2009, over $20 million of the $33 million goal had been met)
Sydney Lewis 1940, Law 1943 - Virginia businessman; art collector; founder of Best Products; recipient with his wife, Frances, of 1987 National Medal of the Arts  
Bill Miller 1972 - chairman and former chief investment officer of Legg Mason Capital Management

Academia
David Lawrence Anderson- Founder and first President of Soochow University, China
George A. Baxter - President of W&L and Hampden-Sydney College
J. Bowyer Bell 1953 - historian, artist and art critic
John Chavis 1799 - educator and Presbyterian minister, among the first U.S. college graduates of color
George H. Denny - Professor of Latin and President at Washington and Lee University; President at the University of Alabama
John DiPippa, Law 1978 - former Dean of the University of Arkansas at Little Rock School of Law
Charles A. Graves, Law 1872 - professor at W&L Law and at the University of Virginia School of Law
William B. Hesseltine 1922 - history professor at University of Wisconsin-Madison
Milton W. Humphreys - alumnus; introduced the Roman pronunciation of Latin at Washington and Lee as a professor; first Professor of Latin and Greek at Vanderbilt University and the University of Texas at Austin; taught at the University of Virginia; president of the American Philological Association, 1882-1883
Robert Huntley 1950, Law 1957 - former dean of W&L Law, former president of Washington and Lee University, former president, chairman, and CEO of Best Products
John Malcolm McCardell, Jr. 1971 - vice-chancellor of Sewanee University and president emeritus of Middlebury College
William Swan Plumer 1825 - professor at Pittsburgh Theological Seminary (1854-1862); professor of didactic and polemic theology at Columbia Theological Seminary(1867-1875); professor of pastoral, casuistic, and historical theology at Columbia (1875-1880)
John Thomas Lewis Preston 1828 - founder of Virginia Military Institute
Henry L. Roediger III 1969 - cognitive psychologist and researcher at Washington University in St. Louis
Kenneth P. Ruscio 1976 - professor of public policy, president of Washington and Lee University
 Jeffrey L. Seglin, (1978), writer of weekly column "The Right Thing," faculty member, John F. Kennedy School of Government at Harvard University
Robert Shepherd 1959, Law 1961 - professor emeritus of law at the University of Richmond School of Law
Robert Waymouth 1982 - professor of chemistry at Stanford University
William R. Vance, Law 1869 - professor at Yale Law School; Dean of W&L Law, George Washington University Law School, and the University of Minnesota Law School
Charles M. Williams 1937 - Harvard Business School professor

Literature and journalism
Samuel Zenas Ammen -  literary editor of The Baltimore Sun; founder of the Kappa Alpha Order
Terry Brooks, Law 1969 - author of fantasy fiction, 12 million copies in print
David Brown, Law - former host of the Marketplace radio program
William Alexander Caruthers - author of novels, including The Kentuckian in New York (1834)
Kelly Evans 2007 - journalist; co-host of Worldwide Exchange and Squawk on the Street on the CNBC business news channel
Jerry Hopkins 1957 - journalist, biographer, author - longtime editor of and contributor to Rolling Stone magazine, biographer of Jim Morrison No One Here Gets Out Alive, Elvis Presley, Yoko Ono, David Bowie and others
Alex S. Jones 1968 - Pulitzer Prize-winning ex-reporter for The New York Times; director of Harvard University's Shorenstein Center for Press, Politics and Public Policy
Philippe Labro - French author, journalist and film director
Rebecca Makkai 1999 - author of novels, including Pulitzer and National Book Award finalist The Great Believers, and short stories
Roger Mudd 1950 - Congressional Correspondent for CBS and PBS; host on the History Channel; member of the Delta Tau Delta fraternity
Mark Richard 1986 - author and winner of the PEN/Ernest Hemingway Foundation Award
Tom Robbins - author of Even Cowgirls Get the Blues (did not graduate; attended for two years before moving to New York to become a poet)
Tom Wolfe 1951 - writer (creator of New Journalism); author of The Electric Kool Aid Acid Test and The Bonfire of the Vanities, with I Am Charlotte Simmons chronicling college life; former trustee; in 2005, became the only outside speaker in recent times to deliver the undergraduate commencement address

Science and technology
 Jennifer Dowd 1996 - social scientist and public health researcher
Joseph L. Goldstein 1962 - won Nobel Prize for Medicine for research in cholesterol metabolism and discovery that human cells have low-density lipoprotein (LDL) receptors that extract cholesterol from the bloodstream
William Wilson Morgan 1924-26 undergraduate classes (graduated from University of Chicago 1927) - astronomer; co-developed the MK system for the classification of stars, and classification systems for galaxies and clusters; Director of Yerkes Observatory

Art, entertainment, and athletics
Rob Ashford 1982 - choreographer and director; eight-time Tony Award nominee (winning one), five-time Olivier Award nominee, Emmy Award winner, Drama Desk winner, and Outer Critics Circle Award winner
Fielder Cook 1946 - three-time Emmy Award-winning director and producer; director of The Homecoming (TV, 1971), which begat series The Waltons
Kate Cordsen 1986 - photographer and contemporary artist; first female graduate of W&L
Dom Flora 1958 - basketball standout
Warren Giles - executive in Baseball Hall of Fame
Jay Handlan 1952 - basketball standout who once scored 66 points in a single game
Mike Henry - writer, comedian, producer, Family Guy
T. C. Lin - Taiwanese filmmaker, photographer, and writer
Walt Michaels 1951 - head coach of NFL's New York Jets, 1977-1982; fullback for Generals, led them to 1951 Gator Bowl against Wyoming
Meagan Miller 1996 - opera singer
Mike Pressler 1982 - head lacrosse coach at Bryant University; former coach at Duke University who resigned during Duke lacrosse case
W. Stanley Proctor - sculptor 
Gordon P. Robertson, Law - CEO of the Christian Broadcasting Network
Cy Twombly 1953 - abstract artist
Justin Walker - actor, Christian Stovitz in the 1995 comedy film Clueless

Religion 
 Steve Breedlove - Anglican cleric, bishop of the Anglican Diocese of Christ Our Hope in the Anglican Church in North America

Faculty
John White Brockenbrough - federal judge, founder, and former Dean of the Washington and Lee University School of Law
Martin P. Burks - former Dean of W&L Law and justice on the Virginia Supreme Court
Judy Clarke - criminal defense attorney for Ted Kaczynski, Zacarias Moussaoui, Eric Rudolph, Susan Smith, Jared Lee Loughner, and Dzhokhar Tsarnaev
Creigh Deeds - Democratic nominee for Governor of Virginia in 2009 and Virginia State Senator
Nora Demleitner - former Dean of W&L Law and Hofstra University School of Law
Edward Southey Joynes - Professor of Modern Languages
Donald W. Lemons - Justice on the Supreme Court of Virginia
Lee McLaughlin - American football player with the Green Bay Packers of the National Football League (NFL) and a head football coach at Washington and Lee University.
Jeffrey P. Minear - counselor to Chief Justice John G. Roberts, Jr.
Blake Morant - current Dean of the George Washington University School of Law
David F. Partlett - former Dean of W&L Law and of Emory University School of Law
Fred Perry - tennis champion; won 8 Grand Slams and coached the W&L tennis team
Marvin Banks Perry Jr. - President of Goucher College and Agnes Scott College.
Rodney A. Smolla - Dean of Widener University School of Law; former dean of W&L Law; First Amendment scholar; former president of Furman University
Waller Redd Staples - member of the Confederate House of Representatives; justice on the Virginia Supreme Court
Barry Sullivan - former dean of W&L Law; professor at Loyola University Chicago School of Law
John Randolph Tucker - Virginia Attorney General, former dean, and former president of the American Bar Association

Trustees and benefactors
Cyrus McCormick, inventor of the mechanical reaper; founder of the McCormick Harvesting Machine Company, which became part of International Harvester Company
George Washington, first president of the United States, general of the Continental Army

Presidents
See List of presidents of Washington and Lee University.

References

Washington and Lee University people